Arvo Heino Raudanma Hansen (born 24 September 1947) is a Danish former professional footballer who played as a midfielder. He played for Danish club Slagelse B&I, as well as German clubs FC St. Pauli and SC Preußen Münster in the 2. Bundesliga. He made 31 appearances and scored five goals for the Denmark national team from 1972 to 1978, and represented Denmark at the 1972 Summer Olympics football tournament

Hansen started his career with Slagelse B&I. He debuted for the Danish national team in July 1972, scoring a goal in the 5–2 win against Iceland. He scored three goals in six games at the 1972 Olympics in Germany, and moved to play in the 2. Bundesliga after the tournament. He played 74 games and scored 14 goals for St. Pauli between 1974 and 1976, and played 63 games and scored three goals for Münster between 1976 and 1978. He moved back to Slagelse where he ended his career.

References

External links
 
 

1947 births
Living people
People from Kalundborg Municipality
Danish men's footballers
Association football midfielders
Denmark international footballers
FC St. Pauli players
SC Preußen Münster players
2. Bundesliga players
Footballers at the 1972 Summer Olympics
Olympic footballers of Denmark
Danish expatriate men's footballers
Danish expatriate sportspeople in Germany
Expatriate footballers in Germany
Sportspeople from Region Zealand